Hymnology (from Greek ὕμνος hymnos, "song of praise" and -λογία -logia, "study of") is the scholarly study of religious song, or the hymn, in its many aspects, with particular focus on choral and congregational song. It may be more or less clearly distinguished from hymnody, the creation and practice of such song. Hymnologists, such as Erik Routley, may study the history and origins of hymns and of traditions of sung worship, the biographies of the women and men who have written hymns that have passed into choral or congregational use, the interrelationships between text and tune, the historical processes, both folk and redactional, that have changed hymn texts and hymn tunes over time, and the sociopolitical, theological and aesthetic arguments concerning various styles of sung worship.

Hymnology is not an "-ology" in the usual sense of an independent discipline that has a proper set of concepts and critical vocabulary that must first be learned before progress can be made.  Rather, it's two disciplines: one that studies the texts and follows the rules of literary scholarship, the other that is trained in music and follows the rules of musicology. The "-ology" just means that they might publish in the same journals, occasionally attend the same conferences, or be asked to serve on a hymnal committee. If they write about the interaction between music and text, this is purely by instinct: there is no "scholarly consensus" for an underlying set of principles about how the interaction can be optimized. Often, the term "hymnologist" simply refers to anyone who has enough standing within the faith community to be asked to serve on a hymnal committee.

Hymnology is sometimes more strictly construed, as in A Dictionary of Hymnology, edited by John D. Julian, which concerns itself very largely with the history, textual changes, and translations of hymns, and with the biographies of hymnographers, and very little with the poetic metres of these hymns, or with the hymn tunes to which these are sung.

See also  
Foot (prosody) 
Hymn tune 
Hymnal
Hymn Society in the United States and Canada
Hymnographer
Hymns and hymn tunes
Metre (hymn)
Metre (poetry)
Hymnody of continental Europe

References

External links

 A Dictionary of Hymnology on Google Books.  
The Hymn Society of Great Britain and Ireland
The Hymn Society in the United States and Canada

A list of periods, areas and genres of hymnody
Catholic Encyclopedia

 
Religious music